The Highland Railway River class was a class of steam locomotive with a 4-6-0 wheel arrangement. They were designed by F. G. Smith, who had joined the Highland Railway in 1904 from the North Eastern Railway. His initial post was as manager of the Locomotive, Carriage and Wagon works at Inverness (usually referred to as Lochgorm works). When Peter Drummond departed to the Glasgow and South Western Railway at the end of 1911 Smith was appointed Chief Mechanical Engineer in his place.

Delivery to Highland Railway

The 'Rivers' were Smith's only design for the Highland Railway, and they were the largest and most powerful locomotives built for that company. However, Smith had taken this into account, and had designed the 'Rivers' to cause much lower 'hammer blow' upon the track than the existing Highland locomotives. When the effects of hammer blow were taken into account, the 'Rivers' put the same total weight onto the track as the previous 'Castle' Class 4-6-0s.

The first two engines were delivered to Perth around the end of August 1915, when a row immediately erupted between Smith and the company's Chief Civil Engineer Alexander Newlands. Smith and Newlands had a difficult working relationship and avoided speaking to one another. It seems that Smith had not discussed the high deadweight axle loadings with Newlands, and Newlands did not raise the matter until the locomotives arrived. On delivery, the locomotives were immediately placed in a siding while the engineers checked the drawings. Once this exercise was completed Newlands banned them from the line as being too heavy for a number of bridges and out of gauge. Smith argued that the effect of hammer blow needed to be taken into account, but the company's board sided with Newlands and Smith was forced to resign.

Sale to Caledonian Railway

The Highland managed to sell all six locomotives to the Caledonian Railway, and legend has it that they made a profit of £500 per engine in the process. They were out of gauge to the 'Caley' as well, but the modifications required were slight and quickly made.

In Caledonian service they proved reliable and were well liked by their crews, despite their being outside-cylindered and the 'Caley' being an inside-cylinder line. They spent most of their lives on fast goods between Aberdeen and Carlisle. Many footplatemen and shed mechanical staff regarded them as being better than the Caley's own 4-6-0 designs.

LMS service

By the 1920s, the effects of hammer blow were more widely understood, and it was accepted that the locomotives could safely work over the Highland Main Line. In fact, taking hammer blow into account, the total weight which the 'Rivers' put onto the track was around a ton less than the 'Clan' 4-6-0s which had been built to replace them. Some of the weaker bridges on the Highland had, in any event, been strengthened by that time. Thus the 'Rivers' ended their days on the line for which they had originally been built. The last of the class was withdrawn in 1946.

Numbers and names

Planned numbers and names in Highland service were

References

 Vallance, H. A. (1938). The Highland Railway
 Vaughan, Adrian. (2003). Railway Blunders

River Class
Caledonian Railway locomotives
4-6-0 locomotives
Hawthorn Leslie and Company locomotives
Railway locomotives introduced in 1915
Scrapped locomotives
Passenger locomotives